Quicksilver Times was an antiwar, counterculture underground newspaper published in Washington, DC. Its first issue was dated June 16, 1969, with Terry Becker Jr., a former college newspaper editor and reporter for the Newhouse News Service, the main instigator in the founding group of antiwar activists. It ran for 3 years, with its final issue (vol. 4, no. 9) appearing in Aug. 1972. Publication was irregular and during the latter part of its run it was publishing once every 3 weeks. It was a member of the Liberation News Service and the Underground Press Syndicate. Quicksilver Times was one of several anti-government underground papers of the period now known to have been infiltrated by government informants.

Along with opposition to the Vietnam War, the paper was outspoken in its support for the Black Panthers, feminism, gay rights, and other movements of the period, while embracing the aesthetics and ethos of the hippie/drug culture. The design of the tabloid paper was simple but lively, making liberal use of drawings, photographs, and underground comix.

An article in the Pittsburgh Press  described Quicksilver Times as being put out every 10 days by a staff collective, with Terry Becker the first among equals. 20,000 copies were published of each issue at a total cost of $1200. Staffers were unpaid but each received 400 free copies of each issue to sell for 25 cents each. Other vendors bought copies wholesale from the paper for 10 cents each. Some hippie street vendors were claimed to have sold as many as 1000 copies.

See also
 List of underground newspapers of the 1960s counterculture

References 

Alternative press
Publications established in 1969
Publications disestablished in 1972